is the debut album by Japanese band Wagakki Band, released on April 23, 2014 by Avex Trax in three editions: CD only, CD with DVD, and CD with Blu-ray. The album features Vocaloid (one UTAU) songs covered in the band's style of mixing traditional Japanese musical instruments (wagakki) with heavy metal. Their version of Kurousa-P's "Senbonzakura" has since become the band's signature song on live performances.

The album peaked at No. 5 on Oricon's albums chart and was certified Gold by the RIAJ.

Track listing
All tracks are arranged by Wagakki Band.

Personnel 
 Yuko Suzuhana – vocals
 Machiya – guitar, vocals (9)
 Beni Ninagawa – tsugaru shamisen
 Kiyoshi Ibukuro – koto
 Asa – bass
 Daisuke Kaminaga – shakuhachi
 Wasabi – drums
 Kurona – wadaiko

Charts

Certification

References

External links 
 
  (Avex Group)
 
 

Wagakki Band albums
2014 debut albums
Japanese-language albums
Avex Trax albums
Covers albums